WHYP may refer to:

 WHYP-LP, a low-power radio station (98.9 FM) licensed to serve Corry, Pennsylvania, United States
 WWCB, a radio station (1370 AM) licensed to serve Corry, Pennsylvania, which held the call sign WHYP from 2010 to 2013